Baba Hasan-e Shomali (also Romanized as Bābā Ḩasan-e Shomālī) is a village in Liravi-ye Shomali Rural District, in the Central District of Deylam County, Bushehr Province, Iran. At the 2006 census, its population was 35, in 6 families.

References 

Populated places in Deylam County